Marimatha tripuncta is a moth of the family Noctuidae first described by Heinrich Benno Möschler in 1890. It is found in the Caribbean and southern Florida.

Adults are on wing from late April to mid-October.

Taxonomy
This species was tentatively identified in Florida as Thioptera [=Marimatha] aurifera (Walker, 1862) by Kimball (1965) and was listed as T. aurifera by Franclemont and Todd (1983) and Heppner (2003). Marimatha aurifera is a South American species that lacks a frontal tubercle and has very different genitalia

External links

Noctuinae